Lionel Edward Weston (born 22 February 1947) played for the England rugby team.

Life
Weston was born on 22 February 1947 at Wenlock in Shropshire.  He was educated at Bedford Modern School.

Weston’s test debut was against France at Colombes on 26 February 1972.  He played one further game for England against Scotland at Murrayfield on 18 March 1972.  In terms of club rugby, Weston played for Bedford, West of Scotland F.C. and Rosslyn Park. He is often quoted for his remark, ‘I don’t know why prop forwards play rugby’.

On 17 May 2019, Weston was awarded the title of Friend of Buckingham.

References

External links
 

1947 births
Living people
England international rugby union players
Bedford Blues players
West of Scotland FC players
Rosslyn Park F.C. players
People educated at Bedford Modern School
Rugby union scrum-halves
Rugby union players from Shropshire